The Neue Synagoge ("New Synagogue") is the synagogue, community centre, and museum of the Jewish community in Darmstadt. Inaugurated on in 1988, the synagogue was built as part of a citizens’ initiative to commemorate the 50th anniversary of Kristallnacht Known also as the ‘Holocaust Memorial Synagogue’, the architectural complex was designed to fulfil the needs of the city's Jewish population, who had been without a place of worship since the 1938 pogrom when Darmstadt's three synagogues were destroyed. Built according to plans by Alfred Jacoby, with a significant programme of stained glass windows designed by British architectural artist Brian Clarke. The religious and cultural complex is located on the site of the city's former Gestapo headquarters.

History

Present day
The cultural complex is the site of the local museum of Jewish history and culture,Museum der Jüdischen Gemeinde Darmstadt.

Architecture
The first "newly constructed synagogue in the postwar period to recall the traditional form of a central, domed building", the design marked the start of Jacoby's development of a distinct modern Jewish religious architectural vernacular.

Stained glass

Further reading
 Reinhold-Postina, Eva (1988). Neumann, Moritz (ed.). "Das Darmstädter Synagogenbuch" (in German). Darmstadt: Eduard Roether Verlag.
 Frenzel, Martin (2008). "Eine Zierde unserer Stadt": Geschichte, Gegenwart und Zukunft der Liberalen Synagoge Darmstadt. Darmstadt: Justus von Liebig Verlag.
 "Die Bürgerschaft gibt der jüdischen Gemeinde eine Synagoge zurück": Einweihung der Synagoge in Darmstadt 9. November 1988:Ansprachen. (1989). Germany: Magistrat der Stadt Darmstadt, Presse und Informationsamt.

See also
 History of the Jews in Germany

Gallery

References

External link

Reform synagogues in Germany
Buildings and structures in Darmstadt
Museums in Darmstadt
Synagogue buildings with domes
Synagogues completed in 1988
1988 establishments in West Germany
Synagogues in Germany